"Nothing's Gonna Change My Love for You" is a song written by composers Michael Masser and Gerry Goffin. It was originally recorded by American singer and guitarist George Benson for his 1985 studio album 20/20, released by Warner Bros. Records. This original version was produced by co-writer Masser, and was released as a single in Europe only in 1985. Two years later, in 1987, Hawaiian singer Glenn Medeiros sang his version of the song which became a worldwide success.

George Benson version
The single release of the George Benson version contains Benson's cover version of "Beyond the Sea (La Mer)" as the B-side track. Benson's version of "Beyond the Sea" was released as a single, which peaked at number 60 on its second week in the UK Singles Chart and remained on the chart for the following two weeks.

The music video of the Benson version shows a field where are Benson, a woman, a chauffeur, a car and an airplane. Benson and women are side by side throughout the video, and he remains connected to her by their right hands. When the song starts, Benson sings looking at the camera and looking at the woman alternately. The chauffeur who brought the two car appears throughout the video a little behind the two and looking for them. At the beginning and end of the video, Benson and the woman kiss.

7-inch release
 "Nothing's Gonna Change My Love for You" (Michael Masser, Gerry Goffin) – 4:04
 Beyond The Sea (La Mer) (Charles Trenet, Jack Lawrence) – 4:10

Personnel
 Written by – Michael Masser, Gerry Goffin
 Produced by – Michael Masser
 Arranged by – Robbie Buchanan
 Programmed by [Synthesizer] – Robbie Buchanan
 Lead Vocal – George Benson
 Guitar Soloist – George Benson
 Backing Vocals – Deborah Thomas, Richard Marx
 Guitar – Dann Huff, Paul Jackson, Jr.
 Keyboards – Robbie Buchanan
 Bass – Nathan East
 Drums – Carlos Vega

Glenn Medeiros version

A 1987 version by American singer Glenn Medeiros reached number 12 on the U.S. Billboard Hot 100, and topped the charts in Canada and the United Kingdom. It also topped the charts in a further four countries in Europe. Medeiros also recorded the song in Spanish under the title "Nada cambiará mi amor por ti".

Background and release
Medeiros originally released the song on a small independent label at the age of 16 in 1986, after winning Brown Bags to Stardom, a local radio talent contest at KIKI radio, in his hometown of Honolulu. Jay Stone, the program director and future producer of the song, convinced Medeiros to record it and make it his first release, as Benson's "The Greatest Love of All", another Michael Masser composition, had been a No. 1 hit for Whitney Houston earlier that year. Guy Zapoleon, program director of KZZP in Phoenix was on vacation in Honolulu where his friend Jay Stone asked him to listen to the song on KIKI. Zapoleon loved the song and took the record back to Phoenix, where it debuted on KZZP in October 1986. By January 1987, the song hit No. 2 for four weeks, then through word of mouth to other program directors, the airplay spread with other stations having top 5 success with the song and by June 1987 the song had become a national hit.

The song was featured in a late 1987 episode of the US daytime soap opera Days of Our Lives as well as 1988 episodes of As the World Turns, The Bold and the Beautiful, and General Hospital.  It was also used in a 1989 episode of Santa Barbara.  The song reached No. 1 in June 1988 in the United Kingdom and stayed at the top for four weeks.

In 2009, the song was used in France in a television advert for Spontex sponges. The song was additionally used in a commercial for Thinkbox in the UK in 2015. During the same year, the song was used in an episode of British soap opera Coronation Street, where characters Beth Tinker and Kirk Sutherland got married.

Music video
The music video features Medeiros strolling around a beach with a girl in a pink dress.

Track listings
 7" single
 "Nothing's Gonna Change My Love for You" (Seven Inch Version) - 3:46
 "Nothing's Gonna Change My Love for You" (Instrumental) – 5:11

 12" single 
 "Nothing's Gonna Change My Love for You" (Extended Version) – 6:09
 "Nothing's Gonna Change My Love for You" (Seven-inch Version) – 3:46
 "Nothing's Gonna Change My Love for You" (Instrumental Version) – 5:20

Chart performance

Weekly charts

Year-end charts

Certifications

References

External links
 .
 .
 Page of this song by Benson at 45cat.
 Page of this song by Benson at Discogs.
 

1985 songs
1985 singles
1987 debut singles
George Benson songs
Glenn Medeiros songs
Songs written by Michael Masser
Songs with lyrics by Gerry Goffin
Warner Records singles
Mercury Records singles
Contemporary R&B ballads
Pop ballads
UK Singles Chart number-one singles
European Hot 100 Singles number-one singles
RPM Top Singles number-one singles
SNEP Top Singles number-one singles
Irish Singles Chart number-one singles
Dutch Top 40 number-one singles
1980s ballads